Go Now is a 1995 television film directed by Michael Winterbottom and starring Robert Carlyle as an MS-afflicted construction worker and soccer player, living in Bristol with his girlfriend and struggling with the onset of multiple sclerosis.

It had a limited theatrical release in the United Kingdom and United States. It won the Prix Europa Television Programme of the Year 1995.

Cast

Reception
On review aggregator website Rotten Tomatoes, the film has a 60% approval rating based on 10 reviews, with an average ranking of 6/10.

Lisa Schwarzbaum of Entertainment Weekly gave the film a score of "B−".

Janet Maslin of The New York Times wrote that the film "depicts the onset of multiple sclerosis with force and accuracy, thanks to the understated precision of Carlyle's performance and the real fear and frustration he conveys".

According to Derek Elley of Variety, the film "[is] a genre-busting an-them to life, love and friendship that's a further feather in the cap of multitalented Brit helmer Michael Winterbottom".

References

External links

British television films
1995 television films
1995 films
Films directed by Michael Winterbottom
Gramercy Pictures films
PolyGram Filmed Entertainment films
1990s English-language films